David Ekholm (born 16 January 1979) is a Swedish biathlete. He competed in three events at the 2006 Winter Olympics.

References

External links
 

1979 births
Living people
Biathletes at the 2006 Winter Olympics
Swedish male biathletes
Olympic biathletes of Sweden
People from Hagfors Municipality